Terrill is a surname and more rarely a given name. It may refer to:

Surname
Chris Terrill (born 1952), British filmmaker
Chris Terrill (executive) (born 1967), American businessman
Craig Terrill (born 1980), American football player
Hazard Bailey Terrill (1811–1852), Canadian politician
James B. Terrill (1838–1864), American general
Mark Terrill (born 1953), American writer and translator
Marshall Terrill (born 1963), American writer
Randy Terrill (born 1969), American politician
Richard Terrill (born 1953), American writer
Ross Terrill (born 1938), Australian historian
Ruby Terrill Lomax (1886–1961), American educator 
Timothy Lee Terrill (1815–1879), Canadian politician
William R. Terrill (1834–1862), American general
Winslow "Windsor" Terrill (1870–1897), American baseball player

First name
Terrill Byrd (born 1986), American football player
Terrill R. Dalton (born 1967), American cult leader
Terrill Hanks (born 1995), American football player
Terrill Shaw (born 1976), American football player

See also
Terrell
Tyrrell (surname)
Terral (surname)